John Weil Nathan (born March 1940) is an American translator, writer, scholar, filmmaker, and Japanologist. His translations from Japanese into English include the works of Yukio Mishima, Kenzaburō Ōe, Kōbō Abe, and Natsume Sōseki. Nathan is also an Emmy Award-winning producer, writer and director of many films about Japanese culture and society and American business. He is Professor Emeritus of Japanese Cultural Studies at the University of California, Santa Barbara.

Early life
Nathan was born in New York City and spent part of his childhood in Tucson, Arizona. He was born into a non-practicing Jewish family. His father was a painter, and his grandfather was a reporter at The Jewish Daily Forward. In 1961, Nathan graduated from Harvard College, where he studied under Edwin O. Reischauer.

Career
The summer after graduation, he worked at Nomura Securities in New York. He moved to Japan directly after, teaching English as a second language to native Japanese speakers at a newly opened English conversation school in Tokyo that had been funded by the Ford Foundation. He was also hired to teach English literature at Tsuda College, a school for young women. Nathan became the first American to pass the entrance exams of the University of Tokyo and be admitted as a traditional student. He lived in Tokyo for close to five years and departed Japan in 1966 to start a PhD program at Columbia University in New York. He dropped out of Columbia and began teaching a class in modern Japanese literature at Princeton University. In September 1968, Nathan moved to Cambridge, Massachusetts, where he had been appointed a junior fellow in the Society of Fellows at Harvard University. The status the society conferred allowed Nathan to undergo oral examinations in candidacy for a PhD without having attended graduate school. Nathan would eventually receive a doctorate in Far Eastern languages from Harvard. Nathan accepted a full-time teaching appointment at Princeton University in 1972, resigning from the position in 1979. Nathan is currently Professor Emeritus of Japanese Cultural Studies at the University of California, Santa Barbara (UCSB). He previously served as the Koichi Takashima Professor of Japanese Cultural Studies at UCSB.

Nathan's works focus on Japanese culture, Japanese literature, Japanese cinema, the theory and practice of translation, and the sociology of business culture. Nathan first met Yukio Mishima in 1963. In 1965, at the age of 25, Nathan translated Mishima's The Sailor Who Fell from Grace with the Sea. Impressed by Nathan's translation, Mishima requested Nathan sign on as his translator and help Mishima in his quest in being awarded the Nobel Prize for Literature. Nathan was more interested in translating the work of Kenzaburō Ōe. Nathan ultimately refused to translate Mishima's 1964 novel , opting instead to translate Kenzaburō Ōe's 1964 novel . Mishima, who was considered an "arch-rival" of Ōe, abruptly severed ties with Nathan afterwards. In 1974, Nathan authored Mishima: A Biography (1974), a biography of Yukio Mishima. In 1994, Kenzaburō Ōe was awarded the Nobel Prize in Literature and Nathan accompanied him to Stockholm.

In 1972, Nathan provided the script for Hiroshi Teshigahara's film Summer Soldiers about U.S. Army deserters seeking refuge in Japan. He left Princeton in the late 1970s to pursue filmmaking and created three documentaries about the Japanese.

In 1999, Nathan published Sony: The Private Life, a biography of Sony Corporation. The book was the product of 115 interviews conducted by Nathan with current and past key executives of Sony. In 2004, he published Japan Unbound: A Volatile Nation's Quest for Pride and Purpose, a scholarly work which provides a historical context to contemporary Japan. In 2008, Nathan published his memoir, Living Carelessly in Tokyo and Elsewhere. In 2013, Nathan published a translation of Natsume Sōseki's unfinished novel Light and Dark. In 2018, Nathan published a biography of Sōseki titled Sōseki: Modern Japan's Greatest Novelist.

Reception
Nathan was described by Damian Flanagan in The Japan Times as "the one critic of Japanese literature that towers above the rest."

Personal life
Nathan married Japanese artist Mayumi Oda in 1962, in a Shinto wedding ceremony at the Prince Hotel in Akasaka. They had two sons, but separated after several years of marriage. In 1984, Nathan married Diane Siegelman, with whom he has a daughter and a son.

Works

Translations

Novels

Short stories

Books
 
 
 
 
 
 "Tokyo Story: A Profile of Shintaro Ishihara". The New Yorker, April 9, 2001.
 Words, Ideas, and Ambiguities: Four Perspectives on Translating from the Japanese. Howard Hibbett, Edwin McClellan, John Nathan and Edward Seidensticker. Chicago, Ill.: Imprint Publications, 2000.
 "Kenzaburō Ōe: Mapping the Land of Dreams". Japan Quarterly 42(1), January–March, 1995.

Documentary film 
 The Japanese, A Film Trilogy: Full Moon Lunch, The Blind Swordsman, Farm Song (1979); music for Farm Song written by Toru Takemitsu
 The Colonel Comes to Japan (1982, Emmy Award) – A film about KFC in Japan.
 Entrepreneurs (1986)
 Daimyo – The Arts of Feudal Japan (1988)

Screenplay
 Summer Soldiers (1972), dir. Hiroshi Teshigahara

References 

1940 births
Living people
Japanese–English translators
American Japanologists
Japanese literature academics
Harvard College alumni
Harvard University alumni
University of Tokyo alumni
Princeton University faculty
University of California, Santa Barbara faculty
20th-century American translators
21st-century American translators
People from New York City
People from Tucson, Arizona
People from Santa Barbara, California
American expatriates in Japan
American documentary film directors
Jewish American writers
Jewish translators